Maude Boltz (1939-2017) was an American artist and co-founder of the A.I.R. Gallery.

Biography

Boltz was born in 1939 in Pottsville, Pennsylvania. She attended the Philadelphia College of Arts and Yale University. In 1972 Boltz co-founded the A.I.R. Gallery, a female artists cooperative gallery in New York City. In 1978 Boltz's work was included in a show at MoMA PS1 entitled Overview: An Exhibition in Two Parts by the A.I.R. Gallery. She died in 2017.

Her image is included in the iconic 1972 poster  Some Living American Women Artists by Mary Beth Edelson.

Boltz's work is in the collection of the Smithsonian American Art Museum and the Whitney Museum of American Art.

References

External links
 images of Boltz's work on Women in the Arts Foundation
 Remembering Maude Boltz on the A.I.R. Gallery website

1937 births
2017 deaths
20th-century American women artists